Cid soil series is the name given to a soil which has developed from argillite or fine-grained metavolcanic rock in the Piedmont region of Virginia, North Carolina and South Carolina. It is moderately well or somewhat poorly drained, and moderately deep. Acidity ranges from strong to extreme except where lime has been applied. Cultivated soils in this series grow corn, soybeans, small grains and hay; otherwise, mixed forests with numerous species of pine and oak are dominant.

Official profile description

References

Soil in the United States
Types of soil